The Devič Monastery  is a Serbian Orthodox abbey in Kosovo. It was built in 1434 and is dedicated to St Joanikije of Devič. Devič was declared Monument of Culture of Exceptional Importance in 1990, and it is protected by the Republic of Serbia.

History
The founder of the monastery is Despot Đurađ Branković, who had it built in memory of his daughter. In the Ottoman census from 1455, the monastery is mentioned as the church of the Theotokos (dedicated to The Entry of the Most Holy Theotokos into the Temple). During Turkish occupation the monastery was pulled down, but the church and the site with the grave of St. Joanikije was reconstructed, and was painted in 1578.

The monastery was destroyed and burnt down during World War II in 1941 by forces of the Albanian Fascist Party, the prior Damaskin Bošković was killed, and Italian troops disassembled the two big bells and took them away in 1942. It was rebuilt in 1947.

Devič was a target of the Kosovo Liberation Army (KLA) in 1999. The monastery was vandalized and all food and two cars were stolen. The marble tomb of the patron saint St. Joannicius of Devič was desecrated by local Albanian in June 1999. Since then it has been under the constant protection of French KFOR troops.

It was the target of new attacks by Albanians in the most serious unrest in Kosovo on 18 March 2004 when the nuns were evacuated for safety reasons by Danish KFOR troops. Following that the monastery was pillaged and torched. The Serbian Orthodox Church received confirmation of the monastery's plight the following day from the United Nations Interim Administration Mission in Kosovo (UNMIK).

Gallery

See also
Monument of Culture of Exceptional Importance
Tourism in Kosovo
List of Serbian Orthodox monasteries

Notes

References

Further reading

External links
Video of the burned, destroyed and desecrated Devič monastery complex

Official page on Devic Monastery
WashPost: Serbian Nun Stands Her Ground Against Albanians 5-25-1999
Photo story on destruction of Devič, ERP KIM, March 2004

Christian organizations established in the 15th century
Serbian Orthodox monasteries in Kosovo
Cultural Monuments of Exceptional Importance (Serbia)
Medieval Serbian architecture
Medieval Serbian sites in Kosovo
Destroyed churches in Kosovo
15th-century Serbian Orthodox church buildings
Skenderaj
Cultural heritage of Kosovo
Monuments and memorials in Kosovo
Churches destroyed by arson
Patriarchate of Peć